Anolis monticola, the La Hotte bush anole or foothill anole, is a species of lizard in the family Dactyloidae. The species is found in Haiti.

References

Anoles
Reptiles described in 1936
Endemic fauna of Haiti
Reptiles of Haiti
Taxa named by Benjamin Shreve